"Turn It into Love" is a single released by Australian singer Kylie Minogue. It was taken from her debut studio album Kylie (1988). The single was released in December 1988 in Japan only. The B-side was a new song "Made in Heaven", which also served as the B-side to both "Je ne sais pas pourquoi" and "It's No Secret" in other international territories.

The song, written and produced by Stock Aitken Waterman (SAW), was also released by British singer Hazell Dean the same year, sparking years of speculation about which performer recorded it first. But the track's writer and producer Matt Aitken insists it was written for Minogue, and later given to Dean when it became apparent the Australian singer didn't need another UK single from her debut album.

Kylie performed the song (as part of medleys) during her On a Night Like This Tour and Showgirl Homecoming shows in the 2000s, as well the Mushroom Records 25th birthday concert in Melbourne, Australia in 1998.

Also a favourite track among Stock Aitken Waterman enthusiasts, the song also featured on the 2005 UK compilation album Stock Aitken Waterman Gold, one of just two tracks included that were not released as a single in the UK.

Format and track listing
This is the format and track listing of major single release of "Turn It into Love".

Japanese 7" single and 3" CD
 "Turn It into Love" – 3:35
 "Made in Heaven" – 3:24

Official versions
"Turn It into Love"
 Album version / single version
 Instrumental: Initially used on a very rare Turkish bootleg 7" in 1988 and then as the theme music to the 'gallery' section of the 2002 Greatest Hits 1987–1992 DVD. Also made available as part of PWL's re-issues of back catalogue releases on iTunes.
 Extended instrumental: included exclusively on the Japanese Greatest Hits 1987–1997 CD in 2003
 Backing Track: Unavailable until the PWL's re-issues of back catalogue releases on iTunes.

No official vocal extended version of "Turn It into Love" was ever produced at PWL.

"Made in Heaven"
 Album version / single version
 Maid in England Mix, aka Made in Australia Mix or Made in Sweden Mix
 Heaven Scent Mix (edit): shorter version included on the Australian "Never Too Late" single and the UK Greatest Hits 87–92 (2002 release)
 Heaven Scent 12" Mix (extended): included exclusively on Greatest Remix Hits Volume 4 in Australia in August 1998
 Original 12" Mix: Unavailable until the PWL's re-issues of back catalogue releases on iTunes.
 Instrumental: Unavailable until the PWL's re-issues of back catalogue releases on iTunes.
 Backing Track: Unavailable until the PWL's re-issues of back catalogue releases on iTunes.

Live performances
Minogue performed the song on the following concert tours:
 On a Night Like This Tour (as part of the Hits Medley)
 Showgirl: The Homecoming Tour (as a medley with "Light Years")

Charts and certifications

Weekly charts

Certifications

|}

Hazell Dean version

In September 1988, just prior to Kylie's "Turn It into Love" being released in Japan, British Hi-NRG singer Hazell Dean released her version which was also produced by Stock Aitken Waterman, however, the arrangement was noticeably different from that of Kylie's version.

Published reports and notes contained in Dean's own 2012  greatest hits compilation, Evergreen, have claimed that the singer was at PWL Studios recording "Maybe" when she was played a selection of songs being recorded for Kylie's debut album. In this version of events, "Turn It into Love" stood out, and she liked the song so much, she asked Pete Waterman to let her record her own version of the song. Waterman obliged and it was eventually released as the lead into the release of Dean's second Stock Aitken Waterman-produced album Always in October 1988.

However, Dean has refuted these long-repeated claims, insisting she never knew Kylie had recorded the song until the Australian singer's version later came to prominence. Asserting that she thought she was recording a totally original song when given "Turn It Into Love", Dean admitted she was "p-ed off" when she discovered there had been a double up, calling the reuse of the song by SAW "a cop out".

Dean's version of "Turn It into Love" peaked at number 21 in the UK Singles Chart for the week ending 8 October 1988 and number 30 in Swiss singles chart for the week ending 30 October 1988. Hazell believed it should have been released as the follow-up to "Who's Leaving Who" and felt it would have been a bigger hit. She also stated recently in an interview published on her website that it is her least favourite song to perform live.

Same Difference version
Brother-sister duo Same Difference recorded "Turn It into Love" and included it on their debut album which was released on 1 December 2008. It was intended to have been the second single from the duo (and from the album), and was due for release in 2009 but was cancelled.  In 1990, Hong Kong band Echo covered this song in Cantonese.

Wink version

Released by Polystar Records on 16 November 1988, it was their third single, with Japanese lyrics written by Neko Oikawa. The song was used as the theme of the Fuji TV drama series . The B-side is a Japanese-language cover of Annica Burman's "I en ding ding värld".

The single became Wink's first No. 1 on Oricon's singles chart. It sold over 645,000 copies, making it the duo's biggest-selling single.

Track listing
All lyrics are written by Neko Oikawa; all music is arranged by Motoki Funayama.

Chart positions
Weekly charts

Year-end charts

Cover versions

References

External links
Kylie Minogue version

Wink version

1988 singles
1989 singles
1988 songs
Songs written by Mike Stock (musician)
Songs written by Matt Aitken
Songs written by Pete Waterman
Song recordings produced by Stock Aitken Waterman
Pete Waterman Entertainment singles
Kylie Minogue songs
Hazell Dean songs
Wink (duo) songs
Japanese-language songs
Japanese television drama theme songs
Songs with lyrics by Neko Oikawa
Oricon Weekly number-one singles